Dirty Diamonds is the seventeenth solo studio album by American rock musician Alice Cooper, released on July 4, 2005 internationally, and August 2 in the US.

The album peaked on Billboard's "Top Independent Albums" chart at #17, and the Billboard 200 album chart at #169 - Cooper's highest charting album since The Last Temptation, 11 years prior.

Track listing

Personnel
 Alice Cooper - Vocals, Harmonica
 Ryan Roxie - Guitar
 Damon Johnson - Guitar
 Chuck Garric - Bass
 Tommy Clufetos - Drums
 Xzibit - Rap on "Stand"
 Eric Singer - Frequent drummer for Alice Cooper is pictured on the album booklet/tray, but does not play on Dirty Diamonds.

2005 albums
Alice Cooper albums
New West Records albums